Liposcelis decolor is a species of booklouse in the family Liposcelididae. It is found in Africa, Australia, Europe and Northern Asia (excluding China), North America, South America, and Southern Asia.

References

Liposcelis
Insects described in 1925
Articles created by Qbugbot